West End is a western suburb of Geraldton, Western Australia. Its local government area is the City of Greater Geraldton.

The suburb was gazetted in 1972.

Geography
West End is located on a peninsula extending to the west of Geraldton's central business district. While the suburb is mostly industrial and contains much of the Port of Geraldton's infrastructure, West End also hosts a small residential area, as well as a nature park on the coast around the peninsula.

Demographics
Nearly half of West End residents live in caravans or other non-permanent accommodation.

Facilities
 Belair Gardens Caravan Park
 Point Moore
 Point Moore Lighthouse
 Pages Beach
 Greys Beach
 Geraldton Volunteer Marine Rescue Base

References

Suburbs of Geraldton